Hawking is a progressive metal band from Vancouver, British Columbia, Canada, composed of vocalists and guitarists Tom Vanderkam and Saul Sitar, bassist and vocalist Chris Young, and drummer and vocalist Chartwell Kerr.

Musical style
The band's music is most broadly categorized as Progressive Metal. However, notable Melodic Hardcore, Post-Hardcore, Symphonic Metal and Alternative Rock influences are present in their work.<ref name=Pete2015> MusicBox Pete June 29, 2015</ref> The band’s earlier work was often described as Math rock or "Math-Pop", alluding to their use of interlocking guitar riffs and highly syncopated rhythms.

History

Inception and The Crash (2013)
Hawking embarked on their first tour of Western Canada in August 2013.

On August 26, 2013, the band was involved in a single vehicle accident as they were headed home from the final show of their Western Canadian tour, leaving all members of the band with injuries. Two of the group members, drummer Chartwell Kerr and bassist Paul Engels, were both airlifted to hospital in critical condition.  Kerr sustained extensive damage to his legs. Engels suffered a severe head injury, and was in a coma for five weeks after the accident. He was unable to continue with the band. After a 6-month hiatus, Chris Young replaced Engels on bass in February 2014.

Post-Crash (2014)
During the summer months of 2014, the band completed a 50-date tour covering the Western USA and most of mainland Canada.

Present (2015-present)
Hawking released their debut self-titled EP independently on July 14, 2015."PREMIERE - Hawking - Safe and Sound"PureVolume May 13, 2015 Reviews were positive."Hawking Return With Hook-Rich Pop-Rock" CraveOnline July 13th, 2015"Pre-Release Review: Hawking" Canadian Beats July 6, 2015 The band completed a 43-date North American tour in the months immediately following the release, and became known for their live shows and relentless touring schedule.

On August 26, 2016, the band released their single "Comfortable", completing a Canadian tour in support.

Hawking released their full-length album "Diverge" on April 7, 2017, completing a North American tour in support.

In Fall 2019, the band completed a 28-date North American tour with Stellar Circuits.

On January 31, 2020, Hawking released their single “Never Bow”.

On March 20, 2020, Hawking released their single “Elucidate, Articulate”.

On March 18, 2022, Hawking released their single “A Tragedy (This Melody)”.

Band members

Present
Tom Vanderkam - Lead Vocals, Guitar
Saul Sitar - Vocals, Lead Guitar
Chartwell Kerr - Vocals, Drums
Chris Young - Vocals, Bass

Previous
Ben Klassen - Vocals, Lead Guitar
Paul Engels - Vocals, Bass

Other appearances
Hawking appears in the film Midnight Sun (2016). Front man Tom Vanderkam and former lead guitarist Ben Klassen appeared in the film If I Stay (2014). Vanderkam also owns and operates an independent booking agency, Badmouth Booking.

DiscographyA Tragedy (This Melody) (Single) (2022)Elucidate, Articulate (Single) (2020)Never Bow (Single) (2020)Diverge (2017)
01. Catalyst 
02. Broken Glass 
03. Homesick 
04. Lying Through Your Teeth 
05. Stepping Stone 
06. Comfortable 
07. Disclosure 
08. North of the Black Sea 
09. Haunted House 
10. Outside 
11. Leave You BehindComfortable (Single) (2016)Hawking EP'' (2015)
01. Safe and Sound
02. Cold Hands
03. Books on Tape
04. Diastole
05. Systole

References

External links
Band Website
Band Facebook Page
Band Twitter Page

Canadian indie rock groups
Musical groups from Vancouver
Musical groups established in 2012
2012 establishments in British Columbia